This is a list of all tornadoes that were confirmed by the National Climatic Data Center in the United States from January to March 1982. During this period, 81 tornadoes touched down across 23 states, resulting in 7 fatalities and numerous injuries. The strongest of these storms was an F4 in the Texas and Oklahoma Panhandles on March 18. Activity greatly varied between the three months, with January being above average, February at record low levels and March around average. Aside from two notable outbreaks, tornado events were sporadic and scattered across the country. More than half of the 60 tornadoes in March occurred during a single outbreak from March 14 to 17.

United States yearly total

January

February

March

References

Footnotes 

Tornadoes of 1982
1982 natural disasters in the United States
1982, 01
January 1982 events in the United States
February 1982 events in the United States
March 1982 events in the United States